Most Promising Young Actress (French: Meilleur espoir féminin) is a 2000 French comedy film, directed by Gérard Jugnot.

Plot
Yvon Rance, hairdresser by vocation, in the small town of Cancale, have one student daughter Laetitia, he wants to make her a successful hairdresser. She would open a salon in Laval or Quimper. But Laetitia wants to make films, she secretly auditioned and was selected for the leading role. Not easy to break the news to her father who shows rather unpleasant and, as soon as he heard the news, trying by all means to prevent his daughter to make films. Yvon, which nevertheless wants happiness of his daughter, finally agrees to take her on location in Paris, but never stays away, always suspecting Stéphane Leroy, the writer and director of the film, to shoot with Laetitia disturbing sequences.

Cast

 Gérard Jugnot as Yvon Rance
 Bérénice Bejo as Laetitia Rance
 Antoine Duléry as Stéphane Leroy
 Chantal Lauby as Françoise
 Hubert Saint-Macary as Loïck
 Sabine Haudepin as Hélène
 Didier Flamand as Belabre
 Dora Doll as Madame Guiguan
 Mohamed Hicham as Kader Achour
 Daniel Martin as Michel
 Philippe Beglia as Andrea
 Sylvie Granotier as Claudia
 Laurent Lebras as Cyril
 Frédérique Meininger as Madame Pigrenez
 Anne-Marie Jabraud as Madame Picot
 Anna Gaylor as Madame Favart
 Marie Mergey as Madame Le Cloarec
 Thierry Obaïka as François
 Élise Otzenberger as Julie
 Arthur Jugnot as Alex
 Patrice Juiff as Marco
 Romain Thunin as Christophe
 Justine Bruneau as Marie
 Noémie Ringressi as Anna
 Claire Chiron as Brigitte
 Jean-Claude Bourlat as Ronald
 Olivier Granier as Jean-Paul
 Victoria Obermayer as Stéphanie

Cameo
 Ticky Holgado as The Homeless
 Jean-Pierre Foucault as himself
 Daniela Lumbroso as herself
 Thierry Lhermitte as A Comedian
 Philippe de Broca as The Director
 Dominique Besnehard as The Flattering
 Michèle Garcia as The Buyer
 Guillaume de Tonquédec as SNCF Employee

Award
Bérénice Bejo was nominated for the César Award for Most Promising Actress.

References

External links

2000 films
2000s French-language films
2000 comedy films
French comedy films
Films directed by Gérard Jugnot
2000s French films